The 2013 African Youth Championship is an international football tournament to be held in Algeria from 16 March until 30 March 2013. The semi-finalists of the competition qualify for the age restricted 2013 FIFA U-20 World Cup which requires players to be born on or after 1 January 1993. The regulations of the African Youth Championship omit any age restrictions in what appears to be an administrative error.

The 8 national teams involved in the tournament were required to submit a list of up to 40 players to the CAF administration on or before 4 February 2013 (sixty days before the first game of the final tournament).
 
Only 21 of the 40 players listed are authorised to take part in the final tournament. The final squad of 21 players must be submitted on or before 6 March 2013 (ten days before the first game of the final tournament). The regulations require that three of the 21 players must be goalkeepers.

Group A

Algeria
Head coach:  Jean-Marc Nobilo

Benin
Head coach:  Sedogbo Alohoutade

Egypt
Head coach:  Rabie Yassin

Ghana
Head coach:  Sellas Tetteh

Notes

Source:

Group B

Democratic Republic of the Congo

Head coach:  Sébastien Migné

Notes
Enoch Ekangamene was initially named in the team but his name was not listed by CAF.

Gabon
Head coach:  Anicet Yala

Mali
Head coach:  Moussa Keita

Notes

Bakary Nimaga of Skenderbeu Korce in Albania was named in the original squad.

Nigeria
Head coach:  John Obuh

References

Squads
Africa U-20 Cup of Nations squads